"Calling All Angels" is a song by American rock band Train. It was included on the band's third studio album, My Private Nation, and produced by Brendan O'Brien. It features Greg Leisz on pedal steel guitar.

The song was the first track to be released from My Private Nation, on April 14, 2003, and peaked at number 19 on the US Billboard Hot 100 chart. It also topped three other Billboard charts: the Adult Alternative Songs, Adult Contemporary, and Adult Top 40 listings. Outside the US, the song entered the top 40 in Australia and New Zealand.

Background
"Calling All Angels" was inspired by a conversation singer Pat Monahan had with his therapist. Monahan said, "She said, "Just remember that we are made up of angels and traitors, and the angel is the one that says, 'You're beautiful and you can do anything you want,' and the traitor is the one that says, 'You're ugly and you can't get anything right.'" And so that song just came from that conversation of, if we all called our angels, what a cool life this would be for all of us."

Critical reception
The song received mixed reviews from rock critics, with Ken Tucker of Entertainment Weekly giving the song a B+ and calling it "an anthemic hymn to commitment...that builds steadily to a gloriously clanging climax." Matt Lee of the BBC was less impressed, describing the track as "pedestrian, the vocals soulless, even more so than" the band's biggest hit single, "Drops of Jupiter (Tell Me)".

Awards and nominations
The recording was nominated for two Grammy Awards at the ceremony held in February 2004. In the category Best Rock Performance by a Duo or Group, it lost out to "Disorder in the House" by Bruce Springsteen and Warren Zevon. In the category Best Rock Song, the winner was "Seven Nation Army" by The White Stripes.

Track listings
European CD single
 "Calling All Angels" (radio edit) – 3:51
 "For You" – 3:04

European maxi-CD single
 "Calling All Angels" (radio edit) – 3:51
 "Fascinated" – 3:26
 "Landmine" – 3:49
 "Calling All Angels" (video)

Australian CD single
 "Calling All Angels" (radio edit) – 3:51
 "Fascinated" – 3:26
 "For You" – 3:04
 "Landmine" – 3:49

Charts

Weekly charts

Year-end charts

Certifications

Release history

Cover versions
In 2016, the song was used in the US version of The Passion.  It was sung by Jencarlos and appeared of the official soundtrack album. It was sung in the story when Jesus (Jencarlos) prays in the Garden of Gethsemane. The tempo was slowed, several lyrics were changed, and the third verse was entirely cut to fit the theme of the scene.

In popular culture
"Calling All Angels" is an unofficial anthem of the Los Angeles Angels baseball team, and is played at Angel Stadium before every game while the video screen shows a montage of the team's history. In addition, the band performed it live prior to the Home Run Derby of the 2010 All-Star Game, which was held at Angel Stadium.

See also
 List of Billboard Adult Contemporary number ones of 2004

References

External links
 Single release info from discogs.com

2003 singles
2003 songs
Columbia Records singles
Song recordings produced by Brendan O'Brien (record producer)
Songs written by Pat Monahan
Train (band) songs